A bedwetter is a person who engages in nocturnal enuresis.

Bedwetter may also refer to:

The Bedwetter, memoir by actress and comedian Sarah Silverman 2010
Travis Miller (musician), releasing music in 2017 as Bedwetter
Bedwetter (band), San Antonio band formed by John Dufilho, Jason Garner and Colin Jones

Bedwetters (band), Estonian pop punk band formed in September 2004